The Huckleberry Ridge Tuff is a tuff formation created by the Huckleberry Ridge eruption that formed the Island Park Caldera that lies partially in Yellowstone National Park, Wyoming and stretches westward into Idaho into a region known as Island Park. This eruption, 2.1 million years ago, is the third most recent large caldera-forming eruption from the Yellowstone hotspot. It was followed by the Mesa Falls Tuff and the Lava Creek Tuff eruptions.
The eruption likely occurred in 3 phases, separated by decades.

See also
Yellowstone Caldera
Snake River Plain
Island Park Caldera
Henry's Fork Caldera

References

 Yellowstone Caldera, Wyoming

Yellowstone hotspot
Volcanism of Idaho
Volcanism of Wyoming
Geologic formations of Wyoming
Geologic formations of Idaho
Landforms of Yellowstone National Park
Quaternary Idaho
Quaternary Wyoming
Tuff formations
VEI-8 eruptions
Pleistocene volcanism
Volcanic eruptions in the United States
Plinian eruptions